Dračevo is a suburb in the municipality of Kisela Voda, North Macedonia. It is a suburb of Skopje and one of the first major settlements in that region and has a fully developed socio-economical life. It is located 10 km south-east from the center of the city of Skopje.
It was first mentioned in 1300 AD

Demographics
According to the 1467-68 Ottoman defter, Dračevo appears as being inhabited by mixed Slavic-Albanian Orthodox population. Some families had a mixed anthroponomy - usually a Slavic first name and an Albanian last name or last names with Albanian patronyms and Slavic suffixes.

According to the statistics of Bulgarian ethnographer Vasil Kanchov from 1900, 1180 inhabitants lived in Dračevo, all Bulgarian Exarchists.

According to the Secretary of the Bulgarian Exarchate Dimitar Mišev ("La Macédoine et sa Population Chrétienne"), in 1905 there were 1080 Bulgarians in Dračevo, labelled by him as exarchists.

In his 1927 map of Macedonia, German explorer Leonhard Schultze-Jena shows Dračevo as Bulgarian.

According to the 2002 census, the suburb had a total of 10605 inhabitants. Ethnic groups in the suburb include:

Macedonians 9269
Romani 276
Turks 270
Serbs 225
Albanians 179
Bosniaks 140
Vlachs 28
Others  218

Nearby the suburb Dračevo is the village of Dračevo, a rural extension of the settlement. According to the 2002 census, the village had a total of 8641 inhabitants. Ethnic groups in the village include:

Macedonians 7741
Romani 339
Bosniaks 268
Turks 106
Serbs 64
Albanians 22
Vlachs 16
Others  85

Economy 
The economy life is mildly developed, with a great perspective on further development. This is mainly because of the closeness to the city of Skopje, railroad station, close to the highway and supply of water.

Sports 
There are two football clubs "FK Dračevo" and "SSK" and the basketball clubs KK Angeli & KK Dracevo.

The team handball club RK Dračevo plays in the Macedonian Handball Super League for the 2011–12 season.

References

External links

Kisela Voda Municipality
Villages in Kisela Voda Municipality
Neighbourhoods of Skopje